Paula Leitón Arrones (born 27 April 2000) is a female water polo player of Spain.

She was part of the Spanish team at the 2015 World Aquatics Championships. She participated in the 2016 FINA Youth Water Polo World Championships, winning a silver medal and she represented Spain's women water polo in the Olympic Games of Rio de Janeiro  in 2016.

See also
 List of World Aquatics Championships medalists in water polo

References

External links
 
http://www.sport.es/es/noticias/natacion/paula-leiton-anos-gran-sorpresa-del-equipo-waterpolo-para-mundial-kazan-4359947
http://www.zimbio.com/photos/Paula+Leiton/Water+Polo+Day+8+Baku+2015+1st+European+Games/i6ghhkHKVMX

Spanish female water polo players
Living people
Place of birth missing (living people)
2000 births
Water polo players at the 2016 Summer Olympics
Water polo players at the 2020 Summer Olympics
Mediterranean Games gold medalists for Spain
Mediterranean Games medalists in water polo
Competitors at the 2018 Mediterranean Games
Water polo players at the 2015 European Games
European Games medalists in water polo
European Games silver medalists for Spain
Medalists at the 2020 Summer Olympics
Olympic silver medalists for Spain in water polo
Sportspeople from Terrassa
21st-century Spanish women
Sportswomen from Catalonia
Water polo players from Catalonia